Dioscorea bernoulliana is a type of yam in the family Dioscoreaceae. It is native to Belize, Guatemala, Honduras, and Mexico. It usually grows in woodlands, forests, and mangrove swamps.

References

bernoulliana